Blame It on Fidel is a 2006 French-Italian drama film directed by Julie Gavras. The screenplay, written by Gavras, is based on Domitilla Calamai's Italian novel of the same name. The film stars Nina Kervel-Bey, Julie Depardieu, and Stefano Accorsi.

The film covers an array of philosophy and ideology - everything from Communism to Catholicism to Greek and Asian mythology - which the protagonist must reconstruct from confusion into her own set of beliefs.

Plot

Nine-year-old Anna de la Mesa weathers big changes in her household as her parents become radical political activists in 1970-71 Paris. Her Spanish-born lawyer father Fernando is inspired by his sister's opposition to Franco and by Salvador Allende's victory in Chile; he quits his job and becomes a liaison for Chilean activists in France. Her mother, Marie, a Marie Claire journalist-turned-writer documenting the stories of women's abortion ordeals, supports her husband and climbs aboard the ideological bandwagon. As a result, Anna's French bourgeois life is over. She must adjust to refugee nannies, international cuisine, and a cramped apartment full of noisy revolutionaries.

Cast
 Nina Kervel-Bey as Anna de la Mesa 
 Julie Depardieu as Marie de la Mesa
 Stefano Accorsi as Fernando de la Mesa
 Benjamin Feuillet as François de la Mesa 
 Marie Kremer as Isabelle 
 Raphaël Personnaz as Mathieu
 Carole Franck as Sister Geneviève
 Martine Chevallier as Bonne Maman
 Olivier Perrier as Bon Papa

Release
Blame It on Fidel premiered at the Deauville American Film Festival on 10 September 2006 and opened theatrically in France on 29 November that year. It opened in North American release on 3 August 2007.

Box office
The film earned $9,004 in its opening weekend, ranking number 64 in the domestic box office. It went on to gross $168,065 domestically and $1,192,178 overseas for a worldwide total of $1,360,243.

Critical reception
The film holds a 93% approval rating on review aggregator website Rotten Tomatoes based on 45 critics. On Metacritic, the film has a 74/100 rating, indicating "generally favorable reviews".

References

External links
 
 
 
 
 IONCINEMA.com interview with Julie Gavras

2006 films
2000s historical drama films
French historical drama films
Italian historical drama films
2000s French-language films
Films set in Paris
Films set in 1970
Films set in 1971
Films set in the 1970s
Films shot in France
Films shot in Paris
Films shot in Spain
Gaumont Film Company films
2006 drama films
2000s French films